Andrey Filichkin (born 17 January 1975) is a Russian former alpine skier who competed in the 1994 Winter Olympics, 1998 Winter Olympics, and 2002 Winter Olympics.

References

1975 births
Living people
Russian male alpine skiers
Olympic alpine skiers of Russia
Alpine skiers at the 1994 Winter Olympics
Alpine skiers at the 1998 Winter Olympics
Alpine skiers at the 2002 Winter Olympics